Auglandskollen is a neighbourhood in the city of Kristiansand in Agder county, Norway.  The neighborhood is located in the borough of Vågsbygd and in the district of Vågsbygd. Auglandskollen is north of Kjosneset, south of Augland, east of Kjos Haveby, and west of Auglandsbukta.

Transport

References

Geography of Kristiansand
Neighbourhoods of Kristiansand